Nassarius tango is a species of sea snail, a marine gastropod mollusc in the family Nassariidae, the Nassa mud snails or dog whelks.

References

Nassariidae
Gastropods described in 2004